Paranomus roodebergensis, also known as the honey-scented sceptre, is a flower-bearing shrub that belongs to the genus Paranomus and forms part of the fynbos. The plant is native to the Western Cape, South Africa.

Description

Fire destroys the plant but the seeds survive. The plant is bisexual and pollinated by insects. The fruit ripens, two months after flowering, and the seeds fall to the ground where they are spread by ants.

The tree's national number is 72.6.

Distribution and habitat
The plant occurs in the Rooiberg, Huis River Pass, and Touwsberg.

Gallery

References

External links

Flora of the Cape Provinces
roodebergensis
Plants described in 1970
Endemic flora of South Africa